David Bascome MBE (born January 29, 1970) is a retired association football forward who is currently the head coach of the Baltimore Blast in the Major Arena Soccer League.

Club career
David Bascome started his First Division soccer career at the age of 16 with North Village Rams in Bermuda. At 20 years of age, he signed his first professional contract with the Harrisburg Heat of the National Professional Soccer League, USA. After 12 seasons of professional indoor soccer, Bascome won his first Championship during his 2003–2004 campaign with the Baltimore Blast, then won 7 more 3 as a player and 4 as an assistant coach.

After retiring, he was named to the assistant coaching position of the Blast on October 12, 2006, and helped lead the team to the 2008 MISL Championship in his second season on the coaching staff.

The modern Harrisburg Heat of the Professional Arena Soccer League retired Bascome's #40 jersey in a halftime ceremony during the December 29, 2012, game. Bascome played with the original Harrisburg Heat in 1991 and from 1993 through 2000.

Bascome served as Baltimore Blast assistant coach beginning in 2006. On 28 May 2020, he was promoted to head coach. Earlier in 2020, David's brother Andrew Bascome was named head coach of USL League Two's FC Bascome Bermuda.

International career
Bascome made his debut for Bermuda in a February 1992 friendly match against Norway and he has earned a total of 12 caps, scoring 2 goals. He has represented his country in 5 FIFA World Cup qualification matches.

His final international match was a March 2000 World Cup qualification match against the British Virgin Islands.

Personal life
Bascome was appointed a Member of the Order of the British Empire (MBE) in the 2003 Birthday Honours for services to sport and young people in Bermuda.

In 2016, Bascome and his brother Andrew Bascome revealed they had been sexually abused early in their football careers, with Andrew stating the abuse "went on for years."

References

External links

Profile – Baltimore Blast

1970 births
Living people
People from Smith's Parish
Association football forwards
Bermudian footballers
Bermuda international footballers
North Village Rams players
Harrisburg Heat (NPSL) players
Denver Thunder players
Baltimore Blast (2001–2008 MISL) players
Penn FC players
Major Indoor Soccer League (2001–2008) players
Members of the Order of the British Empire
National Professional Soccer League (1984–2001) players
USL Second Division players
Bermudian expatriate footballers
Expatriate soccer players in the United States
Bermudian expatriate sportspeople in the United States
Major Arena Soccer League coaches
Bermudian Members of the Order of the British Empire